Rodrigues Alves may refer to:

People

 Acácio Rodrigues Alves (1925–2010), first Roman Catholic bishop of the diocese of Palmares, Brazil.
 Francisco de Paula Rodrigues Alves (1848–1919), President of Brazil from 1902 to 1906
 José Maria Rodrigues Alves (born 1949), known as Zé Maria, Brazilian footballer
 José Rodrigues Alves (born 1986), known as Zé Pedro, Portuguese footballer
 Maurício Rodrigues Alves Domingues (born 1978),  Brazilian footballer
 Vitor Manuel Rodrigues Alves (1935–2011), Portuguese soldier and politician

Places

 Rodrigues Alves, Acre, a municipality in the state of Acre, Brazil